is the 1999 Japanese animated epic space opera film. It is the second Doraemon film released after Hiroshi Fujimoto's departure, based on the 19 volume of the same name of the Doraemon Long Stories series. This is the third movie solely produced by Fujiko Production following The Record of Nobita's Parallel Visit to the West (1988) and Nobita's Great Adventure in the South Seas (1998). This movie commemorates the 20th anniversary of the Doraemon film series. It was released on March 6, 1999, together with Doraemon: Nobita's the Night Before a Wedding and Funny Candy of Okashinana!?. It is the 20th Doraemon film.

Plot 

The story starts when Doraemon along with his other friends play a game which he has brought from the future. Doraemon, along with Nobita, Shizuka, Gian, and Suneo enters the game and find themselves in a spaceship game to race. But in the end, Gian and Suneo shoot everyone down, returning Nobita, Doraemon, and Shizuka back to Nobita's room. While waiting for them to finish the game, Nobita asks Doraemon for another gadget, which he uses the Gravity modifier gadget, making the entire room have no gravitational pull. Nobita accidentally farts, sending him flying all over the room and causing his mother to get to his room. When she suddenly got affected by the anti-gravity, she accidentally kicks a tray that breaks the room's window, causing a great vacuum of air to flow out of the room. The space game got thrown out from the room, shutting down Gian and Suneo's spaceship, but not ejecting them from the game.

When the group fixes the mess the vacuum had caused, they realized the game is missing. It turns out that Nobita's mom had thrown the game into the garbage, and it's already taken. Using the Time Camera, Doraemon sees a strange light carrying the game all the way to the hill behind the school, to which it disappeared into a spaceship, fearing that Gian and Suneo had been abducted by a UFO. At that place, they found a strange, glowing rock. Trying to save their friends, Doraemon, Nobita, and Shizuka uses the Space Exploration Boat, using the strange rock to make it go to whatever planet the UFO came from.

The group catches up to the mysterious spaceship, just as they enter a wormhole storm. It's so severe that the Space Exploration Boat started to get damaged. Nobita noticed that the rock started to glow brightly, and takes it as the group abandons ship to the Spaceship. They enter using the Pass Loop, finds the space game, and rescues Gian and Suneo. Suddenly, a young boy, along with a robot, a small fairy, and a big space alien confronts the group, saying they're the owner of the spaceship, and locks Doraemon's group in a room, taking the Pass Loop from them.
 
The spaceship soon encounters problems and has to land on a planet. Doraemon and the others escape the room they're locked in, and finds themselves in a rocky and barren planet inhabited by giant spider creatures. The group manages to evade them, but the spiders soon trap the spaceship in their web. Deciding to help the spaceship and its crew, Doraemon had Gian blow the Go Away Trumpet, enlarged by the Big Light, to make the spiders run. They also helped clear the web from the spaceship.

The young boy introduced himself as Lian, the fairy is Freya, the robot is Log, and the big alien is Gorogoro. They are on their way back to their mothership where they lived after a mission to find a habitable planet to settle in. They agree to take Doraemon and the others back to earth after they arrive to their mothership to fix their warp device. But since their ship tends to break down, they need to land in a planet on their way first. When they try to land on a foggy planet, the ship crashes something, knocking everyone out.

Nobita and the others are the first to get up, and they realized they have landed back on earth. However, unexpected things are happening, like Nobita getting an A+ on his test, and his family treating him to a big feast, including a big pile of dorayaki for Doraemon. Suddenly, Nobita got pricked by the glowing stone in his pocket, then suddenly sees a barren wasteland with giant tree monsters. After taking Doraemon away and making him realize his surroundings, they realized they are hallucinating. Doraemon quickly uses the Faraway Wake Up Clock to snap Shizuka, Gian, and Suneo from their hallucination, and returns to the spaceship. Lian and his crew, who just woke up themselves, rescue everyone, after some trouble with the ship's door, and leave the planet. It turns out that the fog the planet was covered in causes mirages.

On their way, the ship crosses on a space field littered by ship debris, and suddenly many 'live meteors' attach themselves to their ship, draining its energy. They are saved by a missile out of nowhere, but they got surrounded by four mysterious space ships, demanding them to come along. They bring him to a base inside a planet, where they meet Commander Liebert, who turns out to be Lian's father, and Angolmois, an evil cloaked figure who wished to get earth for himself. It turns out that Freya had been working for him and told him about earth. Freya runs away, while the rest is captured.

With the Nuclear Powered Underground Submarine, Doraemon and the group escapes and made a run for Lian's spaceship. Despite Gian and Gorogoro tried to hold back Angolmois's robot soldiers, they almost didn't make it until Freya grabs one of their guns and shoots the incoming soldiers. When Log manages to fly the spaceship, Freya barely manages to enter the ship. The group forgives her and decides to let her stay.

Just as Lian's spaceship break down again, they finally reached their mothership. The leader of the ship, along with their council, discuss what to do with Angolmois' menace towards them, and they decided to ask their 'god'. There's a giant glowing tree in the mothership that the people refer to as their god as it is capable of doing special things. Nobita also realizes that the glowing rock he found back on earth is one of the tree's 'seed' that Lian accidentally dropped. Lian prays to the tree, and a projection of his mother appeared, who are supposed to be dead. She tells him to save his father from Angolmois, who controlled him and some of his soldiers, before disappearing. An attack by Angolmois is imminent.

Using the spaceship from their game, Doraemon, Nobita, Shizuka, Gian, and Suneo joins Lian and several more spaceships to repel Angolmois's fleet. They are badly outnumbered and losing until Freya points out a control rod that controls all the enemy spacecraft. Doraemon, Nobita, and Lian landed on Angolmois's planet close by and uses a gadget to turn the control rod to clay, disabling all Angolmois's spacecraft. With his fleet lost, Angolmois reveals his own spacecraft, unknowingly taking Lian, Doraemon, and Nobita on it. They enter the spacecraft to confront Angolmois and Commander Liebert. The spacecraft is used to latch on the mothership's control room, so Angolmois can use it to attack earth, and orders Liebert to shoot his son. Before he can do so, Liebert snaps out of Angolmois's control, and shoots him instead, as Lian joyfully hugged his father.

However, Angolmois, still alive, tried to control the mothership, only to be shot by Lian, revealing himself to be a robot. Unfortunately, Lian's shot also hits the ship's controls, leaving it on a crash course on Angolmois's planet. Despite the initial panic, Nobita, Doraemon, Gian, and Suneo ties the Reverse Cloak to their spaceship, and all four of them shines it with the Big Light. The cloak enlarges enough to deflect the mothership away from the planet, saving it.

Just as they celebrate, a pile of junk came to life, revealing itself, to be Angolmois, who can use anything to from a body. The group run away as he gives chase until he can't fit through a door, and has to revert to his gooey form. At that time, Doraemon freezes him with the Coagulation Light and sends him to the black hole.

After the galaxy is safe, Lian kept his promise to bring Doraemon, Nobita, Gian, Suneo, and Shizuka back to earth. On his way home, Nobita bumps to his teacher, who shows him his test. Initially fearing that they might end up in another mirage planet, Doraemon and Nobita cheered in joy when Nobita got an F for his test.

In the end, Nobita wonders to the hill behind his school, and is surprised to see Doraemon there. They both wonder if Lian and the mothership inhabitants had finally found a planet to live on.

Cast

Release
The film was released in Japan on 6 March 1999.

Music 
"Kisetsu ga iku toki" sung by Speed

References

External links 
 

Films directed by Tsutomu Shibayama
1999 films
1999 anime films
Nobita Drifts in the Universe
Alien invasions in films
Environmental films
Animated films about robots
Films set on fictional planets
Parody films based on Star Wars
1990s children's animated films
1990s American films